West Thurrock is an area, former civil parish and traditional Church of England parish in Thurrock, Essex, England, located 17.5 miles (28.1 km) east south-east of Charing Cross, London. In 1931 the parish had a population of 5,153. On 1 April 1936, the parish was abolished to form Thurrock.

Location

Nearest places:
 Aveley
 Chafford Hundred
 Grays
 South Ockendon

Nearest stations:
 Chafford Hundred railway station
 Grays railway station
 Purfleet railway station

Industry

Industry along the Thames includes a Unilever chilled distribution centre for all its chilled food products including Flora, Bertolli, I Can't Believe It's Not Butter, Stork, Peperami and AdeZ. A Procter & Gamble (originally Hedley's) plant manufactures detergents and soaps.

The large coal-burning West Thurrock Power Station closed in 1993, and was replaced by a plant making industrial chemicals, particularly the raw materials for detergent manufacture. The 190 metre tall electricity pylons of 400 kV Thames Crossing, the tallest electricity pylons in the UK, remain. Just upstream of the pylons the tunnel of High Speed 1 passes under the Thames.

West Thurrock was formerly the site of a large chalk quarrying and cement making industry. Individual companies included Brooks (which became part of APC), Wouldham Cement and Tunnel Cement (now part of Hanson Cement). Today, this industry is represented only by the works of Lafarge below the Queen Elizabeth II Bridge. A new plant for the production of aluminous cement was completed in 2003.

Buildings
West Thurrock is the location of the Lakeside Shopping Centre on the site of a chalk quarry owned by Tunnel Cement.

The parish church (now redundant) was used for the funeral in the film Four Weddings and a Funeral.

Belmont Castle, England, a neo-Gothic mansion, was built in West Thurrock in 1795 but was demolished in 1943 to make way for a chalk quarry.

Origin of the name
Thurrock is a Saxon name meaning "the bottom of a ship". West Thurrock is one of three "Thurrocks", the others being Little Thurrock and Grays Thurrock.

References

External links
 Photo of St Clement's church and Procter & Gamble on flickr

Populated places on the River Thames
Towns in Essex
Port of London
Former civil parishes in Essex
Thurrock